Diana Krutskikh (born 20 September 1977) is a Russian sailor. She competed at the 2004 Summer Olympics and the 2008 Summer Olympics.

References

External links
 

1977 births
Living people
Russian female sailors (sport)
Olympic sailors of Russia
Sailors at the 2004 Summer Olympics – Yngling
Sailors at the 2008 Summer Olympics – Yngling
People from Anapa
Sportspeople from Krasnodar Krai